Circle II Circle is an American heavy metal band from Tampa, Florida. The band was formed by former Savatage lead vocalist Zachary Stevens and longtime friend and band manager Dan Campbell in 2001. They play varied genres of metal including traditional heavy metal, power metal and progressive metal.

History 
For a period of eight years from 1992 until August 2000, Zachary Stevens was the lead singer of Savatage. After five albums with the group, he left in 2000 citing family reasons. During the winter of 2001, Zak started his comeback with long-time friend and co founder of the band, Dan Campbell, co-writing material with former Savatage lead singer Jon Oliva and guitarist Chris Caffery what would become the songs for the Circle II Circle debut album,  Watching in Silence. The second CIIC record The Middle of Nowhere featured Zak's vocals along with band members Paul Michael Stewart, Andy Lee, Tom Drennan and Evan Christopher.

The band's third release was a concept album, entitled Burden of Truth, based around the concept of Jesus' descendants. It was released on June 6, 2006. Stevens and the band then signed with Intromental Management. Their fourth album, entitled Delusions of Grandeur, was released on April 25, 2008.

Artwork for the band's logo and first three album covers were designed by Dan Campbell and rendered by artist Thomas Ewerhard.  Additional artwork for the concept album Consequence of Power (2010) was created by Claudio Bergamin.

On January 25, 2013, Circle II Circle released their Seasons will Fall album on earMusic.

The live album, Bootleg Live at Wacken 2012, was released on June 20, 2014. A studio album, Reign of Darkness, was released on October 16, 2015.

On December 7, 2016, their former drummer, Adam Sagan, died from cancer at the age of 35.

Personnel 

Current members
 Zachary Stevens – lead vocals (2001–present), keyboards
 Paul Michael "Mitch" Stewart – bass guitar, keyboards (2003–present)
 Christian Wentz – guitars (2012–present)
 Bill Hudson – guitars (2008–2009, 2012–2013, 2015-present)
 Marcelo Moreira – drums (2015–present)
 Henning Wanner – keyboards (2012–present)

Former members 
 Matt LaPorte – guitars (2001–2003, died 2011)
 John Zahner – keyboards (2001–2003)
 Kevin Rothney – bass (2001–2003)
 Christopher Kinder – drums (2001–2003)
 Tom McDyne – lead guitar (2003–2004)
 Tom Drennan – drums (2003–2009)
 Evan Christopher – guitars (2004–2008)
 Marc Pattison – guitars (2014–2015)
 Oliver Palotai – keyboards (2006–2007)
 Johnny Osborn – drums (2009–2011)
 Rollie Feldman – guitars (2010–2011)
 Andy Lee – guitars (2003–2010, 2011)
 Adam Sagan – drums (2011–2013, died 2016)

Timeline

Discography

Studio albums 
 Watching in Silence (2003)
 The Middle of Nowhere (2005)
 Burden of Truth (2006)
 Delusions of Grandeur (2008)
 Consequence of Power (2010)
 Seasons Will Fall (2013)
 Reign of Darkness (2015)

Live albums 
 Bootleg Live at Wacken 2012 (2014)

Extended plays 
 All That Remains (2005)
 Revelations (2006)
 Every Last Thing/So Many Reasons (2008)

Compilations 
 Full Circle: The Best of Circle II Circle (2012)

See also 
 Savatage − Stevens sang lead vocals on four studio albums
 Trans-Siberian Orchestra − Stevens toured with the group as a vocalist
 Jon Oliva's Pain − formed by former Circle II Circle members
 Machines of Grace − Stevens is the vocalist

References

External links 

 
 
 Circle II Circle at Encyclopaedia Metallum

Heavy metal musical groups from Florida
Musical groups from Tampa, Florida
American power metal musical groups
American progressive metal musical groups
American symphonic metal musical groups
Musical groups established in 2001
Musical quartets
Savatage
2001 establishments in Florida